Bachlechner is a German surname.  Notable people with the surname include:

 Klaus Bachlechner (born 1952), Italian footballer
 Thomas Bachlechner (born 1980), Italian footballer, son of Klaus

German-language surnames